Cume da Fajã do Belo is a mountain in the north of the island of São Jorge Island in the Azores. Its elevation is 769 m. It is located northeast of the village Ribeira Seca, and southeast of the village Norte Pequeno. The debris field Fajã do Belo lies north of the mountain, on the coast.

References 

São Jorge Island
Geology of the Azores